No Man's Land is a 2021 American Western film, directed by Conor Allyn from a screenplay by Jake Allyn and David Barraza. It stars Frank Grillo, Jake Allyn, George Lopez, Andie MacDowell, Alex MacNicoll, Jorge A. Jiménez, and Andres Delgado.

Cast
 Frank Grillo as Bill Greer
 Jake Allyn as Jackson Greer
 George Lopez as Ramirez
 Andie MacDowell as Monica Greer
 Esmeralda Pimentel as Victoria
 Alex MacNicoll as Lucas Greer
 Jorge A. Jiménez as Gustavo
 Andres Delgado as Luis
 Ofelia Medina as Lupe
 Tiaré Scanda as Maria

Production
In June 2019, Jake Allyn,  Frank Grillo, Jorge A. Jiménez, George Lopez, Andie MacDowell, and Alex MacNicoll joined the cast of the film, with Allyn directing from a screenplay by Jake Allyn and David Barraza Ibañez.

Principal photography began in June 2019.

Release
In June 2020, IFC Films acquired distribution rights to the film.  The film was released on January 22, 2021.

Reception
Review aggregator Rotten Tomatoes gives the film a 40% approval rating based on 48 reviews, with an average rating of 5.60/10. The website's consensus reads: "Noble yet often monotonous, No Man's Land proves that the old adage about a road paved with good intentions is just as true for a dusty Western trail." According to Metacritic, which sampled 14 critics and calculated a score of 52 out of 100, the film received "mixed or average reviews".

References

External links
 

2021 films
2021 Western (genre) films
2021 multilingual films
American Western (genre) films
American multilingual films
2020s English-language films
2020s Spanish-language films
IFC Films films
Neo-Western films
2020s American films